Seán Hartney (1902 – 11 May 1974) was an Irish Fianna Fáil politician. He was a member of Seanad Éireann from 1951 to 1957. He was elected to the 7th Seanad in 1951 by the Industrial and Commercial Panel. He was re-elected at the 1954 Seanad election but lost his seat at the 1957 Seanad election.

He had previously stood unsuccessfully for Dáil Éireann as a Fianna Fáil candidate for the Limerick constituency at the 1943 general election.

References

1902 births
1974 deaths
Fianna Fáil senators
Members of the 7th Seanad
Members of the 8th Seanad
Politicians from County Limerick